Acid Blue 25 (C20H13N2NaO5S) is an acid dye that is water-soluble and anionic and used for adsorption research. The structure is an anthraquinone.

Properties and applications 
Acid Blue 25 is powder-like and poorly soluble in water. The dye is soluble in solvents such as acetone and ethanol.

Use 
Acid Blue 25 is used for dyeing wool, silk and mixed fabric and printing them in a direct method.

The dye is extensively utilized to color leather, paper, cellulose, and PC blends during the manufacturing process.

References

External links 
 ACID BLUE 25 Basic information chemicalbook.com
 Acid Blue 25 sigmaaldrich.com
 
 TREATMENT OF ACID BLUE 25 CONTAINING WASTEWATERS BY ELECTROCOAGULATION scientificbulletin.upb

Anthraquinone dyes
Acid dyes